Ellen Fitzhugh is an American musical theatre lyricist and librettist. She is most notable for lyrics to the Broadway musical Grind, for which she was nominated for the 1985 Tony Award for Best Original Score.

Other musicals include Herringbone, Paper Moon, Don Juan de Marco, Paradise Found and Los Otros. 

For film, she contributed lyrics to songs in The Great Mouse Detective.

References

American musical theatre lyricists
Broadway composers and lyricists
Year of birth missing (living people)
Living people